Antonio Horvath (3 January 1950 – 23 May 2018) was a Chilean politician who served as a Deputy from 1990 to 1994, and as a Senator from 1994 to 2018.

References

1950 births
2018 deaths
Chilean people of Hungarian descent
Members of the Senate of Chile
Politicians from Santiago
Members of the Chamber of Deputies of Chile
National Renewal (Chile) politicians